Samuel Isadore Rosenberg (born May 18, 1950) is an American politician who represents the 41st legislative district in the Maryland House of Delegates.  Delegate Rosenberg is the House Chair of the Joint Committee on Administrative, Executive, and Legislative Review and has been in the General Assembly since 1983.

Background
Born in Baltimore, Maryland, Rosenberg attended the Baltimore City College high school and then went on to Amherst College where he earned his B.A. degree in political science in 1972. He immediately followed that up with a juris doctor from the Columbia University Law School in 1975. For the last sixteen years, Delegate Rosenberg has taught at the two law schools in Baltimore. He currently teaches Legal Writing and Moot Court at the University of Baltimore and Legislation at the University of Maryland. He has also taught seminars on Law and the Homeless and Legislative Process: Abortion.

In the legislature
Delegate Rosenberg was a lead sponsor of legislation to de-regulate electric utilities in Maryland in 1999, and the lead sponsor of legislation to repeal Maryland's death penalty in the 2007 session of the Maryland General Assembly (HB-225: death penalty repeal. Although the bill failed to get out of committee, Rosenberg has vowed to introduce it again.  Of the 37 bills he introduced in 2007, 9 passed and became law.  Rosenberg has changed his position on legalizing slot machines. He voted against slots in 2005, but for slots in 2007.

Rosenberg posts a daily legislative diary at his website, delsandy.com, when the legislature is in session.

 In his 25 years as a delegate his most significant legislative accomplishments are writing the holding of Roe v. Wade into Maryland law; creating two programs that encourage students to enter public service, by repaying a portion of the educational debt of people who have lower-paying public interest jobs and by providing an up-front scholarship to students planning careers in public service; lead paint abatement legislation; Maryland's welfare reform law; the Voters Rights Protection Act of 2005, which expands access to the ballot and deters activities intended to suppress turnout; extending Maryland's civil rights law to prohibit discrimination on the basis of sexual orientation; and establishing public health priorities for the use of the State's share of the settlement of the tobacco litigation.

During the 2013 legislative session, Rosenberg co-sponsored HB 860 (Baltimore City Public Schools Construction and Revitalization Act of 2013). Signed by the Governor on May 16, 2013, the new law approved 1.1 billion dollars to construct new schools in Baltimore City.

Election results
2006 Primary Race for Maryland House of Delegates – District 41
Voters to choose three:
{| class="wikitable"
!Name
!Votes
!Percent
!Outcome
|-
|-
|Jill P. Carter, Dem.
|13,196
|  31.2%
|   Won
|-
|-
|Samuel I. Rosenberg, Dem.
|9,215
|  21.8%
|   Won
|-
|-
|Nathaniel T. Oaks, Dem.
|9,189
|  21.7%
|   Won
|-
|-
|Wendall Phillips
|6,480
|  15.3%
|   Lost
|-
|-
|Kevin Hargrave
|2,095
|  5.0%
|   Lost
|-
|-
|Karen M. Ferguson 
|2,116
|  5.0%
|   Lost
|}

1998 Race for Maryland House of Delegates – District 42
Voters to choose three:
{| class="wikitable"
!Name
!Votes
!Percent
!Outcome
|-
|-
|Samuel I. Rosenberg, Dem.
|21,768
|  30%
|   Won
|-
|-
|James W. Campbell, Dem.
|20,903
|  29%
|   Won
|-
|-
|Maggie McIntosh, Dem.
|20,443
|  29%
|   Won
|-
|-
|Jeffrey B. Smith Jr., Rep.
|8,399
|  12%
|   Lost
|}

1990 Race for Maryland House of Delegates – District 42
Voters to choose three:
{| class="wikitable"
!Name
!Votes
!Percent
!Outcome
|-
|-
|Samuel I. Rosenberg, Dem.
|12,633
|  34%
|   Won
|-
|-
|James W. Campbell, Dem.
|12,477
|  34%
|   Won
|-
|-
|Delores G. Kelley, Dem.
|11,949
|  32%
|   Won
|-
|-
|Nicholas B. Fessenden, Rep.
|3,396
|  6%
|   Lost
|-
|-
|Ernest B. Gray Sr., Rep.
|2,750
|  5%
|   Lost
|}

1986 Race for Maryland House of Delegates – District 42
Voters to choose three:
{| class="wikitable"
!Name
!Votes
!Percent
!Outcome
|-
|-
|Samuel I. Rosenberg, Dem.
|16,143
|  30%
|   Won
|-
|-
|James W. Campbell, Dem.
|16,000
|  30%
|   Won
|-
|-
|David B. Shapiro, Dem.
|14,978
|  28%
|   Won
|-
|-
|Nicholas B. Fessenden, Rep.
|3,396
|  6%
|   Lost
|-
|-
|Ernest B. Gray Sr., Rep.
|2,750
|  5%
|   Lost
|}

References and notes

External links
 

Democratic Party members of the Maryland House of Delegates
Columbia Law School alumni
Politicians from Baltimore
Amherst College alumni
Baltimore City College alumni
1950 births
Living people
21st-century American politicians